Rekha Devi is an Indian politician from Rashtriya Janata Dal. She is a member of the 2020 Bihar Legislative Assembly election representing Masaurhi (Vidhan Sabha constituency).

References 

Living people
Indian politicians
1969 births